Bertha Marion (née Sherwood) Lahman (1872–1954) was an American botanist specializing in cacti of Oklahoma.

References

1872 births
1950 deaths
19th-century American botanists
Women botanists
20th-century American women scientists
20th-century American botanists
19th-century American women scientists